Todd Lencz is an American psychologist and academic whose research is mainly in the field of psychiatric genetics. He is a professor in the Institute of Behavioral Science at the Feinstein Institute for Medical Research, as well as a professor of Psychiatry and Molecular Medicine at the Donald and Barbara Zucker School of Medicine at Hofstra/Northwell. He also leads the Laboratory of Neurogenomic Biomarkers within the Center for Psychiatric Neuroscience at the Feinstein Institutes for Medical Research. He is the leader of the Cognitive Genomics consorTium (COGENT), the founder and co-leader of the Ashkenazi Genome Consortium, and a member of both the Psychiatric Genomics Consortium and the Enhancing Neuroimaging Genetics through Meta-analysis (ENIGMA) consortium. In 2020, he was elected a fellow of the American College of Neuropsychopharmacology.

References

External links
Faculty page

Living people
Yale University alumni
University of Southern California alumni
21st-century American psychologists
American geneticists
Psychiatric geneticists
Human geneticists
Hofstra University faculty
Year of birth missing (living people)